The 2020 Arctic Winter Games was a scheduled winter multi-sport event which was to take place in Whitehorse, Yukon, between 15 and 21 March 2020. On 7 March 2020, the games were cancelled due to the international coronavirus pandemic.

The Arctic Winter Games is the world's largest multisport and cultural event for young people of the Arctic. The Games is an international biennial celebration of circumpolar sports and culture held weekly, each time with a different nation or region as the host. AWG celebrates sports, social interaction and culture. The Games contribute to creating awareness of cultural diversity and develop athletes to participate in competitions with a focus on fair play. The Games bind the Arctic countries together and include traditional games such as Arctic sports and Dené games.

Organization
On 7 March 2020 it was announced that the 2020 Arctic Winter Games would be cancelled due to the COVID-19 pandemic. The announcement was made through a public joint statement from the Whitehorse 2020 Arctic Winter Games Host Society, the government of Yukon, city of Whitehorse and Chief Medical Officer of Health.

Participants
Nine contingents would have participated in the 2020 Arctic Winter Games.
 Alaska, United States
 Greenland
 Northern Alberta, Canada
 Northwest Territories, Canada
 Nunavik, Quebec, Canada
 Nunavut, Canada
 Sámi people
 Yamalo-Nenets, Russia
 Yukon, Canada (host)

The Games

Sports
21 sport disciplines were scheduled in the 2020 Arctic Winter Games program. Archery would have made its return to the games, having appeared only once before in 1974. Alpine skiing would have returned after not appearing in the 2018 Arctic Winter Games.

References

External links

2020 Arctic Winter Games Official Site
Arctic Winter Games Official Site

 
 

Arctic Winter Games, 2020
2020 in Canadian sports
2020 in Yukon
2020
Multi-sport events in Canada
International sports competitions hosted by Canada
Arctic
Sport in Whitehorse
Multi-sport events cancelled due to the COVID-19 pandemic